Peter Dennis was an actor.

Peter Dennis may also refer to:
Hugh Dennis (Peter Hugh Dennis, born 1962), English actor, comedian and voice-over artist

See also
Peter Denis (1713–1778), English naval officer and Member of Parliament
Dennis (surname)